Metamorphosen, study for 23 solo strings (TrV 290, AV 142) is a composition by Richard Strauss for ten violins, five violas, five cellos, and three double basses, typically lasting 25 to 30 minutes. It was composed during the closing months of the Second World War, from August 1944 to March 1945. The piece was commissioned by Paul Sacher, the founder and director of the Basler Kammerorchester and Collegium Musicum Zürich, to whom Strauss dedicated it. It was first performed on 25 January 1946 by Sacher and the Collegium Musicum Zürich, with Strauss conducting the final rehearsal.

Composition history
By 1944, Strauss was in poor health and needed to visit the Swiss spa at Baden near Zürich. But he was unable to get the Nazi government's permission to travel abroad. Karl Böhm, Paul Sacher and Willi Schuh came up with a plan to get the travel permit: a commission from Sacher and invitation to the premiere in Zurich. The commission was made in a letter by Böhm on August 28, 1944, for a "suite for strings". Strauss replied that he had been working for some time on an adagio for 11 strings. In fact, his early work on Metamorphosen was for a septet (2 violins, 2 violas, 2 cellos and a bass). The starting date for the score is given as 13 March 1945, which suggests that the destruction of the Vienna opera house the previous day gave Strauss the impetus to finish the work and draw together his previous sketches in just one month (finished on 12 April 1945).

As with his other late works, Strauss builds the music from a series of small melodic ideas "which are the point of departure for the development of the entire composition." In this unfolding of ideas "Strauss applies here all of the rhetorical means developed over the centuries to express pain." But he also alternates passages in a major key expressing hope and optimism with passages of sadness, as in the finales of both Gustav Mahler's 6th Symphony and Pyotr Ilyich Tchaikovsky's 6th Symphony. The overall structure of the piece is "a slow introduction, a quick central section, and a return to the initial slower tempo", which echoes the structure of Death and Transfiguration.

There are five basic thematic elements in Metamorphosen. First, there are the opening chords. Second, there is the repetition of three short notes followed by a fourth long note. Third, there is the direct quote from bar 3 of the "Marcia funebre" from Beethoven's Eroica Symphony. Fourth, there is a minor theme with triplets. Fifth, there is the lyrical theme "that becomes the source of much of the contrasting music in major, sunnier keys." The second theme does not stand on its own, but precedes the third and fourth themes. Its most obvious source is Beethoven's 5th Symphony, for example the short-short-short-long repetition of G played by the horns in the third movement. But it has other progenitors: the Finale of Mozart's Jupiter Symphony (a personal favorite of Strauss as a conductor) and the Fugue from Bach's Solo Violin Sonata in G minor BWV 1001. Strauss also used it in the Oboe Concerto, written only a few months after Metamorphosen, displaying "a remarkable example of the thematic links between the last instrumental works". He had also used this motif over 60 years before in his 1881 Piano Sonata.

At the end of Metamorphosen, Strauss quotes the first four bars of the Eroicas "Marcia funebre" with the annotation "IN MEMORIAM!" at the bottom. Metamorphosen exhibits the complex counterpoint for which Strauss showed a predilection throughout his life.

Metamorphosen and the Munich Memorial Waltz
One of the pieces Strauss had been working on before Metamorphosen was the orchestral movement Munich Memorial Waltz, sketches of which appear in the same notebook in which Strauss began sketches for Metamorphosen. The Munich Memorial Waltz has a different time signature (Metamorphosen is in 4/4) and is based on different thematic material, including a waltz and other themes from the opera Feuersnot relating to fire. In fact the Munich Waltz is mainly based on music Strauss wrote for a 1939 film about Munich, which has been called a Gelegenheitswalzer ("Occasional Waltz") and premiered on 24 May 1939. In late 1944 and 1945 Strauss sketched some music in waltz time described in his sketchbook as Trauer um München ("Mourning for Munich"). This music was eventually combined with the 1939 piece as a middle section, headed "Minore – In Memoriam". The new piece was finished on 24 February 1945, and the subtitle Gelegenheitswaltzer was replaced with Gedächtniswalzer ("Memorial Waltz"). The Munich Memorial Waltz (TrV 274a and AV 140) lasts about 9 minutes, and was first published and performed in 1951. Timothy L. Jackson believes that scholars who interpret the early sketches of München as the origin of Metamorphosen have a weak, even untenable case.

Interpretations
Strauss himself never commented on Metamorphosens meaning, beyond the title (which means "changes" or "transformations"). The title does not seem to refer to the musical treatment of the themes, "since within the piece itself the themes never do undergo metamorphosis ... but rather a continuous symphonic development."

It has been widely believed that Strauss wrote the work as a statement of mourning for Germany's destruction during the war, in particular as an elegy for the devastating bombing of Munich, especially places such as the Munich Opera House. The use of the term "In Memoriam" may well echo his use of the same term in the Munich Memorial Waltz, where it is clearly related to Munich. Juergen May believes that the piece is a musical monument to culture in general, "more than three thousand years of humankind's cultural development". A few days after finishing Metamorphosen, Strauss wrote in his diary:
The most terrible period of human history is at an end, the twelve year reign of bestiality, ignorance and anti-culture under the greatest criminals, during which Germany's 2,000 years of cultural evolution met its doom.

There has been speculation about other interpretations. Jackson concludes that Metamorphosen is a philosophical, Goethean study of the underlying cause of war in general, humankind's bestial nature. In his view Metamorphosen uses the classical concept of metamorphosis as a process of transcending from the mundane into the divine, but inverts it such that the outcome of metamorphosis is not an attainment of the divine but rather a descent into bestiality. Michael Kennedy also develops the view that Strauss's chronological rereading of Goethe during 1944 was a crucial influence. He quotes Strauss as telling a visitor: "I am reading him as he developed and as he finally became...Now that I am old myself I will be young again with Goethe and then again old with him—with his eyes. For he was a man of eyes—he saw what I heard."

Niemand wird sich selber kennen,
Sich von seinem Selbst-Ich trennen;
Doch probier' er jeden Tag,
Was nach außen endlich, klar,
Was er ist und was er war,
Was er kann und was er mag.

Wie's aber in der Welt zugeht,
Eigentlich niemand recht versteht,
Und auch bis auf den heutigen Tag
Niemand gerne verstehen mag.
Gehabe du dich mit Verstand,
Wie dir eben der Tag zur Hand;
Denk immer: ist's gegangen bis jetzt,
So wird es wohl auch gehen zuletzt.
No one can really know himself,
detach himself from his inner being
Yet, each day he must put to the test,
What is in the end, clear.
What he is and what he was,
what he can be and what he might be.

But, what goes on in the world,
No one really understands it rightly,
and also up to the present day,
no one desires to understand it.
Conduct yourself with discernment.
Just as the day offers itself;
Think always: it's gone well up to now,
so might it go until the end.

The two verses (which are not consecutive) are taken from the poem "Dedication" (Widmung), about the scholar and artist trying to understand himself and the world. According to Norman Del Mar, "These lines of searching introspection Strauss wrote out in full amongst the pages of sketches for Metamorphosen, the word metamorphosen being itself a term Goethe used in old age to apply to his own mental development over a great period of time in pursuit of ever more exalted thinking."

The quotation from the funeral march of Beethoven's Eroica Symphony with the words "In Memoriam!" has also raised speculation. The Eroica theme is motivically related to one of the main themes of Metamorphosen, but Strauss wrote that the connection did not occur to him until he was almost finished. There are several theories about how and why Strauss quoted Beethoven, and to whom or what "in memoriam" refers. In 1947 the critic Matthijs Vermeulen claimed the whole piece was an elegy for the Nazi regime, and that "in memoriam" referred to Hitler himself (although Hitler did not commit suicide until over two weeks after the piece was completed). This theory was quickly and strongly denied by Willi Schuh, who had been involved with the work from the beginning. Schuh stated that "in memoriam" referred not to Hitler but to Beethoven, and most scholars since then have supported this idea. Another theory involves Beethoven's Eroica having originally been dedicated to Napoleon, but after Beethoven's disillusion with Napoleon rededicated "to the memory of a great man", while Napoleon was still alive and in power; Strauss's quotation of the Eroica and writing "in memoriam" can be seen as having interesting parallels with Strauss's own involvement with and rejection of Hitler and the Nazi regime. Beethoven had ironically "buried" and memorialized the still-living Napoleon. Strauss could have been pointing to a famous precedent for his own rejection of a tyrant he had once been associated with. But while Beethoven had admired Napoleon, there is no evidence that Strauss ever admired Hitler. Also, Strauss was fond of oblique references and multiple layers of meaning and connotation. He may have meant the quotation and words "in memoriam" in more than one way.

Main themes
The main themes of Metamorphosen are given here at the pitch they first occur. The first four themes occur in the first 20 bars. The fifth theme occurs at bar 82, with the tempo marking "etwas fließender" (slightly flowing).

Arrangements
An arrangement for string septet by Rudolf Leopold was published in 1996.

References

Sources

External links
 
 
 , Norwegian Chamber Orchestra with Terje Tønnesen, artistic leader

1945 compositions
Compositions by Richard Strauss
Compositions for string orchestra
Funerary and memorial compositions
Music commissioned by Paul Sacher